Al-Thawra, also referred to as Ath-Thawra, is an Arabic language newspaper published by the Arab Socialist Ba'ath Party of Syria. Another newspaper with the same name was published by the Arab Socialist Ba'ath Party of Iraq but was disbanded during the invasion of Iraq in 2003 by the UK and the USA armies.

History
Al Thawra was first published on 1 July 1963. It is the official newspaper of the Syrian government, and mostly covers governmental initiatives in the social and economic areas. There also other state-owned newspaper, namely Tishreen, Al Baath and Syria Times.

Al Thawra is based in Damascus. Al Wahda institution is the publisher of the daily in addition to Tishreen and Syria Times. As of 2012 Ali Kassem was the editor-in-chief of Al Thawra.

See also
List of newspapers in Syria

References

External links

1963 establishments in Syria
Newspapers established in 1963
Daily newspapers published in Syria
Arabic-language newspapers
Mass media in Damascus
Organization of the Ba'ath Party

ar:صحيفة الثورة